Ours may refer to:

People
 Ours (singer), a French singer and songwriter.
 Wes Ours (born 1977), an American football player

Music
 Ours (band), an American rock group

Songs
 "Ours" (song), by Taylor Swift, 2011
"Ours", a song by Mabel Mercer 1955
"Ours", a song by Sugar Ray 2002
 "Ours", a song by The Bravery for the Twilight Saga: Eclipse soundtrack

Other uses
 An English personal pronoun

See also
 Our (disambiguation)